Manuel 'Manolo' Gaspar Haro (born 3 February 1981) is a Spanish former footballer who played as a right-back.

Club career
Born in Málaga, Andalusia, Gaspar started playing professionally with hometown Málaga CF's reserves, then spent two Segunda División seasons with another team in the region, UD Almería, being named 2005–06's best right-back whilst at the service of the latter.

For 2006–07, upon Levante UD's return to La Liga, Gaspar signed for the Valencian Community side. He appeared scarcely over two seasons, facing relegation in his second with the club immersed in a precarious financial situation.

Gaspar returned to Málaga in July 2008, being pretty much absent of the lineups for most part of the campaign but being heavily used in the final months. He again featured regularly in 2009–10, mainly due to injuries to teammates; however, on 3 April 2010, it was announced that he would miss the rest of the season because of an inflamed appendix, which was successfully operated and removed.

Gaspar continued to be used exclusively as a backup in 2010–11, by both Jesualdo Ferreira and his successor Manuel Pellegrini. On 4 July 2011, aged 30, he left Málaga and returned to the second tier, joining FC Cartagena.

Following an unassuming spell in the Cypriot First Division, Gaspar signed with CD El Palo from Segunda División B. In 2014, still as an active player, he returned to Málaga in directorial capacities.

References

External links

1981 births
Living people
Spanish footballers
Footballers from Málaga
Association football defenders
La Liga players
Segunda División players
Segunda División B players
Tercera División players
Atlético Malagueño players
UD Almería players
Levante UD footballers
Málaga CF players
FC Cartagena footballers
CD El Palo players
Cypriot First Division players
Olympiakos Nicosia players
Spanish expatriate footballers
Expatriate footballers in Cyprus
Spanish expatriate sportspeople in Cyprus